Henryk Tomasz Wojtynek (born March 23, 1950) is a former Polish ice hockey goaltender. He played for the Poland men's national ice hockey team at 1980 Winter Olympics in Lake Placid.

References

1950 births
Living people
Ice hockey players at the 1980 Winter Olympics
Olympic ice hockey players of Poland
Polish ice hockey goaltenders
Sportspeople from Katowice